Dillinger and Capone  is a 1995 American action film directed by Jon Purdy and starring Martin Sheen, F. Murray Abraham, Michael Oliver, Catherine Hicks, and Don Stroud. The film was screened at MystFest in Cattolica, Italy and the Cannes Film Festival in 1995. Written by Michael B. Druxman, the film is not based in real events but imagines a world in which John Dillinger is not killed at the Biograph Theater and lives on to work with Al Capone. The film was acquired by Cinemax and aired on their cable television network periodically in 1996. In 1997 the film was acquired by HBO and aired periodically on that television network.

Plot 
On July 22, 1934, George (Don Stroud) is shot and runs to John Dillinger’s door. George calls out to John but when John answers the door, it turns out to be his brother Roy (Joe Estevez). Roy tells George that John is at the movies, George tells Roy to tell John (Martin Sheen) about the setup about the guards trying to killing him in the theater.

Roy runs to the biograph theater to found out he had been set for what was supposed to happen to his brother, Perkins (Michael C. Gwynne) shoots Roy to death thinking it’s John Dillinger.

John Dillinger (Martin Sheen) hears the gunshots and goes inside the Biograph Theater to see his brothers dead body on the floor. The authorities believe that they have killed Dillinger, and he decides to take advantage of the mistake and retire with anonymity.

Al Capone (F. Murray Abraham) walks out of the front door of jail and bumps into two reporters trying to talk to him about how it is forgotten that he was the king of Chicago.

Cecil (Stephen Davies) drives Al Capone (F. Murray Abraham) in taxi to take him to Chicago. Capone learns Dillinger is alive, and uses this information to coerce Dillinger into committing a heist for the mob.

Cast
 Martin Sheen as John Dillinger
 F. Murray Abraham as Al Capone
 Michael Oliver as Sam Dalton
 Catherine Hicks as Abigail
 Don Stroud as George
 Stephen Davies as Cecil
 Michael C. Gwynne as Perkins
 Jeffrey Combs as Gilroy
 Anthony Crivello as Lou Gazzo
 Clint Howard as Bobo
 Time Winters as Eli

Critical reception
An Entertainment Weekly review in 1995 gave the film a "C minus" rating and described it as "far-fetched fiction". Critic Leonard Maltin awarded the film two stars, and stated that the film is "boosted by slick acting, but it soon slides into a routine heist thriller."

References

External links 
 
 

1995 action films
Films set in the 1930s
American gangster films
1990s English-language films
1990s American films